William George Duzen (February 21, 1870 – March 11, 1944), was a Major League Baseball pitcher.

Duzen was born in Buffalo, New York in 1870. On September 21, 1890, at the age of 20, he made his Players' League as a starting pitcher for the Buffalo Bisons. Duzen would pitch in a second game on September 27, the final game of his career. In his two career games, he lost both of his starts, gave up 20 earned runs in 13.0 innings, and struck out five batters.

References

External links

Retrosheet

1870 births
1944 deaths
Major League Baseball pitchers
Buffalo Bisons (PL) players
19th-century baseball players
Baseball players from Buffalo, New York